Traveller Supplement 2: Animal Encounters is a 1979 role-playing game supplement for Traveller published by Game Designers' Workshop.

Contents
Animal Encounters describes the fauna of various worlds, including grazer, intimidators, reducers, and gatherers, appropriate to worlds of varied size and atmosphere.

Reception
Bob McWilliams reviewed Animal Encounters for White Dwarf #15, giving it an overall rating of 9 out of 10, and stated that "the format is simple to use and lucidly explained and indexed in the brief introductory section, and the overall standard is well up to that expected from GDW."

Forrest Johnson reviewed Animal Encounters in The Space Gamer No. 28. Johnson commented that "This is the 'monster book' for Traveller."

References

Role-playing game supplements introduced in 1979
Traveller (role-playing game) supplements